The 2016 Women's Premier League Rugby season was the eighth season of the Women's Premier League in the United States. It began on September 10 and involved eight teams.

Format 
This was the second year that the WPL went without promotion or relegation. The eight teams were divided into two conferences, Red and Blue, comprising four teams. They each played six conference games, one home and one away. The WPL season occurred in the fall, concurrently with the regular women's club season, with the National Championship being held in November 11–13.

For the Finals, teams were seeded based on the results of their conference during the regular season. The top four teams competed for the Cup and the bottom teams for the Bowl.

Conference standings

Blue Conference

Red Conference

Matches

Week 1

Week 2

Week 3

Week 4

Week 5

Week 6

Playoffs

Bowl Semi-finals

Cup Semi-finals

Bowl Finals

7th place Final

5th place Final

Cup Finals

3rd place Final

Grand Final

References

External links 

 USA Rugby Women's Premier League official site

Women's Premier League
Women's Premier League